Brandon East is a provincial electoral division in the Canadian province of Manitoba. It encompasses half of the City of Brandon, the other half being represented in Brandon West.

Historical riding
The original riding of Brandon East existed from 1886 to 1888, when the City and riding of Brandon was divided into two electoral districts for the first time. The city was re-established as a single riding in 1888.

Current riding
The modern riding of Brandon East was created in 1968, when the City of Brandon was again divided into two separate ridings. It has formally existed since the provincial election of 1969.

The riding borders on Brandon West to the west, and by Minnedosa in all other directions. Brandon itself is the second-largest city in Manitoba (after Winnipeg), and is in the southwestern region of the province.

Brandon East's population in 1996 was 19,850. In 1999, the average family income was $40,233, and the unemployment rate was 8.60%. The service sector accounts for 19% of the riding's industry, followed by retail trade at 15% and health and social services at 14%. Eleven per cent of the riding's residents are aboriginal.

Brandon East had been a safe seat for the New Democratic Party since its re-creation. This changed at the 2016 election, in which Progressive Conservative candidate Len Isleifson defeated the NDP incumbent Drew Caldwell.

At the 2015 Canadian federal election, according to data from Elections Canada, Brandon East voted heavily Liberal. A provincial riding opinion poll in December 2015 showed Brandon East to be a marginal seat between the Conservative and Liberal parties, with the NDP trailing a poor third.

List of provincial representatives

Opinion polls

Election Results

1886 general election

1888 by-election

1969 general election

1973 general election

1977 general election

1981 general election

1986 general election

1988 general election

1990 general election

1995 general election

1999 general election

2003 general election

2007 general election

2011 general election

2016 general election

2019 general election

References

Manitoba provincial electoral districts
Politics of Brandon, Manitoba
1968 establishments in Manitoba